Robert Donald Chandler (April 24, 1949 – January 27, 1995) was an American professional football player who was a wide receiver in the National Football League for twelve seasons.

Early years
Born in Long Beach, California, Chandler was raised in Whittier and graduated from Whittier High School in 1967. He was considered one of the best all-around high school athletes to play in southern California.

College career
Chandler played college football at the University of Southern California in Los Angeles; he was a captain and the team's leading receiver during his senior year in 1970. He played in two Rose Bowl games; as a junior he was named Most Valuable Player of the 1970 Rose Bowl. In the third quarter, Chandler caught a 33-yard touchdown pass from Trojan quarterback Jimmy Jones and broke several Michigan tackles to score and gave USC its margin of victory, 10–3.

Professional career
He also caught four passes for 77 yards in the Raiders' 27–10 Super Bowl XV victory over the Philadelphia Eagles in January 1981.

In the first game of the 1981 season against the Denver Broncos, Chandler stretched out for a pass and took a hit so severely it ruptured his spleen.  Chandler was rushed to a Denver hospital where doctors saved his life. Chandler made a miraculous recovery and returned to the field later in the season, appearing in a total of eleven regular season games.. Though he wasn't able to return right away as a receiver, he was able to resume his normal duties holding the ball for Raiders placekicker Chris Bahr.

In his rookie season of 1971, Chandler saw action in only a handful of games, finishing the season five receptions for 60 yards. Bills coach Harvey Johnson was dismissed at the end of the season and the Bills named Lou Saban as their new head coach. Saban began to use Chandler more in the offense, as Chandler was a starter in all 14 games that season. He scored his first professional touchdown in a 38-14 blow out of the New England Patriots. The opposing quarterback that day was Jim Plunkett, who would be Chandler's teammate on the Raiders several years later. Over the next several seasons for Buffalo, Chandler would be one of the core starters and a favorite target of Bills quarterback Joe Ferguson. Chandler's role was greatly reduced under coach Chuck Knox in 1979. Knox preferred a solid ground game over the passing game. In 1980, Chandler was traded to the Raiders for LB Phil Villapiano and was part of a Raiders team that won Super Bowl XV.

He retired in July 1983; for his career, he had 370 receptions for 5,243 yards and 48 touchdowns, along with 11 carries for 18 yards.

Chandler and running back O. J. Simpson were teammates for a season in college (1968) and seven in the pros at Buffalo (1971–77).

Broadcasting career
Chandler served as a color analyst for NFL games on NBC in 1983, hosted 2 On The Town for KCBS-TV in Los Angeles from 1984–1987, was a sports reporter for KABC-TV in the late 1980s and hosted Amazing Games (a global documentary series about the world's most exotic sports) for ESPN in 1989. He also served as a "Technical Advisor" for the humor book The Unofficial NFL Players Handbook.

Personal life
Chandler's father Gene was the mayor of Whittier, California from 1987 to 1988. Chandler married his college sweetheart, Marilyn, and had three children: Marisa, Justin, and Emma. Chandler earned a law degree from Western State University College of Law. Chandler posed for Playgirl magazine in January 1982. Chandler's niece Sarah George Chester and her daughter Payton were two of the nine victims, along with Kobe Bryant and his 13-year-old daughter Gianna, on board the helicopter that crashed in Calabasas, California on January 26, 2020. Chandler’s nephew Jake George #81 is a WR for the University of Arizona Wildcats Football team.

Death
Chandler began experiencing a nagging cough in 1994. A rare strain of lung cancer was discovered in his lungs in September 1994. He continued to work on Raider broadcasts while undergoing chemotherapy treatment at the USC Norris Cancer Center, but died there on Friday, January 27, 1995, at the age of 45, after a four-month battle with cancer. He was buried at Rose Hills Memorial Park in Whittier.

Legacy
In 1996, USC established the annual Bob Chandler Award, given to an underclassman based on his athletic ability, academic scholarship as well as character on and off the field. The award funds a scholarship for the player's full tuition, room, and board for the following year.

Chandler was inducted into the USC Hall of Fame in November 1999. Highlights of his USC athletic career are on permanent display in USC's Heritage Hall lobby.

Whittier High School's sports facilities are named the Bob Chandler Sports Complex.

References

External links
 Obituary from New York Times

1949 births
1995 deaths
American football wide receivers
Buffalo Bills players
Los Angeles Raiders players
National Football League announcers
Oakland Raiders players
Players of American football from Long Beach, California
USC Trojans football players
Deaths from lung cancer in California
Burials at Rose Hills Memorial Park